Josef Piekarek (born 16 April 1963) is a German bridge player. Besides playing Bridge he is a Physical Education Teacher.

Bridge accomplishments

Wins

 North American Bridge Championships (2)
 Jacoby Open Swiss Teams (1) 2014 
 Mitchell Board-a-Match Teams (1) 2013

Runners-up

 North American Bridge Championships (3)
 Jacoby Open Swiss Teams (1) 2013 
 Reisinger (2) 2009, 2010

Notes

External links
 
 

 1963 births
German contract bridge players
Living people